Jennifer Pawlik is an American politician and a Democratic member of the Arizona House of Representatives representing District 13 since January 9, 2023. She previously represented District 17 from 2019 to 2023. Pawlik was elected in 2018 to succeed retiring State Representative J. D. Mesnard, who instead ran for State Senate. Pawlik defeated Mesnard's mother, Nora Ellen, in the general election on November 6, 2018.

Pawlik graduated from Northern Arizona University, and was a teacher in the Chandler Unified School District prior to being elected to the state legislature.

References

Year of birth missing (living people)
Living people
Democratic Party members of the Arizona House of Representatives
21st-century American politicians
21st-century American women politicians
Women state legislators in Arizona
Northern Arizona University alumni
Schoolteachers from Arizona
21st-century American women educators
21st-century American educators